Davide Ferri (born 19 September 2002) is an Italian professional footballer who plays as a midfielder for  club Pro Patria.

Club career
A product of Pro Patria’s youth system, Ferri was promoted to the first team in 2019. On 2 July 2021, he renew his contract with the club.

References

External links
 
 

2002 births
Living people
Italian footballers
Association football midfielders
Serie C players
Aurora Pro Patria 1919 players